Hesperopsis libya, the Mojave sootywing, Mohave sootywing, Great Basin sootywing or Lena sooty wing, is a butterfly of the family Hesperiidae. It is found in North America from eastern Oregon east to Montana and south to southern California, Arizona, and north-western Mexico including Baja California. Its habitats include alkalai flats, sagebrush desert, desert hills, shale barrens, watercourses, and ravines.

The wingspan is 22–32 mm. The upperside is dark brown with two rows of small white spots on the forewings. The underside of the hindwings is light to dark brown with a pale grey overlay and some white spots. Adults are on wing from July to August in one generation per year in North Dakota and Montana. In Colorado, there are two generations with adults on wing from June to August while adult are on wing from March to October in multiple generations in California. Adults feed on flower nectar.

The larvae feed on the leaves of Atriplex canescens and A. confertifolia. They live in nests of leaves tied together with silk.

Subspecies
Hesperopsis libya libya (Arizona)
Hesperopsis libya lena (Edwards, 1882) 
Hesperopsis libya joaquina Emmel, Emmel & Mattoon, 1998 (California)

See also
List of Lepidoptera that feed on Atriplex

References

External links

Carcharodini
Butterflies of North America
Fauna of California
Fauna of the Great Basin
Fauna of the Mojave Desert
Butterflies described in 1878
Taxa named by Samuel Hubbard Scudder